Nang Si Eba ay Likhain (When Eve was Created) is a Tagalog-language fictional romantic novel written by Filipino novelist Rosauro Almario in 1913.

Reviews 
The novel was the subject of the thesis or dissertation by Marcela C. Zamora in 1957.

See also 
 Satanas sa Lupa

References 

Philippine novels
1913 novels
Tagalog-language novels
Philippine romance novels